Włodzimierz Śpiewak (27 January 1938 – 25 September 1997) was a Polish footballer. He played in eight matches for the Poland national football team from 1962 to 1964.

References

External links
 

1938 births
1997 deaths
Polish footballers
Poland international footballers
People from Sosnowiec
Association footballers not categorized by position